Butuan (pronounced ), officially the City of Butuan (Butuanon: Dakbayan hong Butuan), is a 1st class highly urbanized city in the region of Caraga, Philippines. It is the de facto capital of the province of Agusan del Norte where it is geographically situated but has an administratively independent government. According to the 2020 census, it has a population of 372,910 people.

It served as the former capital of the Rajahnate of Butuan before 1001 until about 1521. The city used to be known during that time as the best in gold and boat manufacturing in the entire Philippine archipelago, having traded with as far as Champa, Ming, Srivijaya, Majapahit, and the Bengali coasts. It is located at the northeastern part of the Agusan Valley, Mindanao, sprawling across the Agusan River. It is bounded to the north, west and south by Agusan del Norte, to the east by Agusan del Sur and to the northwest by Butuan Bay.

Butuan was the capital of the province of Agusan del Norte until 2000, when Republic Act 8811 transferred the capital to Cabadbaran. For statistical and geographical purposes, Butuan is grouped with Agusan del Norte but governed administratively independent from the province while legislatively administered by the province's 1st congressional district. However, the provincial government still holds office in Butuan, the actual transfer of provincial offices to the new capital is still pending.

Etymology
The name "Butuan" is believed to have originated from the sour fruit locally called batuan. Other etymological sources say that it comes from a certain Datu Buntuan, a chieftain who once ruled over areas of the present-day city.

According to Datu Makalipay, Butuan was named after the wife of Datu Balansag who was the tiniente de barangay of the area before.

History

Old Butuan

Butuan, during the pre-colonial times, was known as the Rajahnate of Butuan, an Indianized kingdom known for its metallurgic industry and sophisticated naval technology. The rajahnate flourished at the 10th and 11th centuries CE, and had an extensive trade network with the Champa civilisation and the Srivijaya Empire.

By 1001, the rajahnate had established contact with the Song dynasty of China. The History of Song recorded the appearance of a Butuan mission at the Chinese imperial court, and the rajahnate was described as a small Hindu country with a Buddhist monarchy, which had a regular trade connection with Champa. The mission, under a king named "Kiling", asked for equal status in court protocol with the Champa envoy, but ultimately was denied by the imperial court. However, under the reign of Sri Bata Shaja, the diplomatic equality was eventually granted to the kingdom, and as a result the diplomatic relations of the two nations reached its peak in the Yuan dynasty.

Evidence of these trading links are in the discovery of 11 balangay boats around Ambangan in Barangay Libertad, which was described as the only concentration of archaeological, ancient, ocean-going boats in Southeast Asia. Other evidences of the post are the discovery of a village in Libertad that specializes in gold, deformed skulls similar to reports in Sulawesi, and the discovery of many artifacts by locals and treasure hunters.

Colonial period

On March 31, 1521, an Easter Sunday, Ferdinand Magellan ordered a mass to be celebrated. This was officiated by Friar Pedro Valderrama, the Andalusian chaplain of the fleet, the only priest then. Another priest, the French Bernard Calmette (Bernardo Calmeta) had been marooned at Patagonia with Juan de Cartagena for being implicated in the mutiny at Puerto San Julián. Conducted near the shores of the island, the Holy First Mass marked the birth of Roman Catholicism in the Philippines. Rajah Colambu and Siaiu were said to be among the first natives of the soon-to-be Spanish colony to attend the mass among other Mazaua inhabitants, together with visitors from Butuan who came with the entourage of Colambu, king of Butuan.

Controversy has been generated regarding the holding of the first mass—whether it was held in Limasawa, Leyte or in Masao, Butuan, in the hidden isle made up of barangays Pinamanculan and Bancasi inside Butuan—in the latest discovered site in the small barangay of Barobo, situated near between Agusan del Sur and Surigao del Sur, or elsewhere. It is sure, however, that Ferdinand Magellan did not drop anchor by the mouth of Agusan River in 1521 and hold mass to commemorate the event which was held at Mazaua, an island separate from Butuan which, in the geographical conception of Europeans who wrote about it, was a larger entity than what it is now. Antonio Pigafetta who wrote an eyewitness account of Magellan's voyage described in text and in map a Butuan that stretched from today's Surigao up to the top edge of Zamboanga del Norte.

The first municipal election in Butuan took place in March 1902 in accordance with Public Law No. 82 which coincided with the American occupation of the place.

During the Japanese occupation of the Philippines in World War II, more than half of Butuan, if not all of it, was burned when local guerrilla forces attacked the enemy garrison on March 12, 1943, in the Battle of Butuan. On January 17, 1945, guerrillas attacked Japanese troops on the road between Cabadbaran and Butuan to prevent the Japanese garrison at Butuan from being reinforced. When the guerrillas depleted their ammunition supply, they were forced to retreat. Later in 1945, the Philippine Commonwealth troops in Butuan together with the recognized guerrillas attacked the Japanese forces during the Battle of Agusan. On October 20, 1948, still recovering from the war, the entire municipality was ruined by a fire.

Modern era

By the late 1940s to the 1970s, Butuan's industry specialized in timber, earning it the nickname "Timber City of the South". The plentiful trees of the area invited many investors to the city, and inspired then Congressman Marcos M. Calo to file a bill elevating Butuan for cityhood. On August 2, 1950, this was passed, converting Butuan into a city.

However, by the early 1980s, the logging industry of the city began to decline, although the city was still an economic haven to many investors. The city's main income by that time frame and until this day depended on small and medium business, and large-scale projects by investors. On February 7, 1995, the city was reclassified from a chartered city to a highly urbanized city. Sixteen days later, on February 23, the region of Caraga was created by virtue of Republic Act 7901, with Butuan as its regional center, and the provincial capital of Agusan del Norte. In 2000, Republic Act 8811 formally transferred the capital of Agusan del Norte from Butuan to Cabadbaran, however most provincial offices are still located in the city.

Geography

Butuan is bordered by the municipalities of Magallanes, Agusan del Norte and Remedios T. Romualdez, Agusan del Norte to the north, municipality of Sibagat, Agusan del Sur to the northeast, east and southeast, municipality of Las Nieves, Agusan del Norte to the south, municipality of Buenavista, Agusan del Norte to the west and Butuan Bay to the northwest.

Elevation 
Elevation at these coordinates is estimated at 1.0 meter above sea level (M.a.s.l.).

Land Use 
The existing land use of the city consists of the following uses: agriculture areas (397.23 km2), forestland (268 km2), grass/shrub/pasture land (61.14 km2) and other uses (90.242 km2). Of the total forestland, 105 km2 is production forest areas while 167.5 km2 is protection forest areas.

The forestland, as mentioned earlier, comprised both the production and protection forest. The classified forest is further specified as production forest and protection forest. In the production forest industrial tree species are mostly grown in the area. The protection forest on the other hand, is preserved to support and sustain necessary ecological performance. Included in this are the watershed areas in Taguibo, which is the main source of water in the area,

The city is endowed with swamplands near its coastal area. These swamp areas are interconnected with the waterways joined by the Agusan River. Most of the swamplands are actually mangroves that served as habitat to different marine species.

Filling material needs of the city are extracted usually from the riverbank of Taguibo River. Others are sourced out from promontories with special features and for special purpose.

The fishing ground of Butuan is the Butuan Bay of which two coastal barangays are located. It extends some two kilometers to the sea and joins the Bohol Sea. These are the barangays of Lumbocan and Masao.

Climate
Butuan has a tropical rainforest climate (Köppen climate classification Af).

Demographics

With a total population of 372,910 in the 2020 census, Butuan has an average density of 460 persons per km2, higher than the regional average density of 130 persons per km2.

Economy

Butuan is the commercial, industrial, and administrative center of Caraga region. It is a strategic trading hub in Northern Mindanao with major roads connecting it to other main cities in the island such as Davao, Cagayan de Oro, Malaybalay, Surigao, and soon, Tandag. It hosts one of the busiest airports in the country, the Bancasi Airport, serving around 525,000 passengers in 2012. Cebu Pacific and Philippine Airlines serve the airport. Meanwhile, the nearby Nasipit International Port and in-city Masao Port are providing for its shipping and cargo needs.

The total number of businesses registered in 2013 was 9,619—reflecting a growth of 9.86% and almost 3 times that of the next major Caraga city. New businesses registered numbered 2,032 with a combined capitalization of P504,598,667, an expansion of 75.63 from 2012.

As further proof of its dynamic economy, Butuan's local income reached P330,510,000 in 2013 besting other major cities in the country. By 2014, its local income is expected to reach P513,870,000.00 or register a growth of 55%; and total income (including IRA) will be P1,515,970,000. The city was ranked 4th and 16th Most Competitive City for the years 2012 and 2014 by the National Competitiveness Council of the Philippines.

More than 260 financial institutions are operating in the city such as Metrobank, Banco de Oro, Bank of the Philippine Islands (BPI), Land Bank of the Philippines (Landbank, formerly UCPB since 2022), Philippine National Bank (PNB), Chinabank, EastWest Bank, Rizal Commercial Banking Corporation (RCBC), UnionBank, Security Bank and Maybank. Rural banks are also expanding aggressively. Based on a report from PDIC (as of December 2013), total savings deposit in Butuan amounted to P18,944,854,000, comprising 45% of the total deposits in Caraga Region. The Bangko Sentral ng Pilipinas (BSP) opened its regional office here to take advantage of the vibrant gold trading industry in the region. Insurance companies, led by Philam Life, are also present in the city.

The city's major agricultural produce are rice, bananas, coconuts, poultry, shrimp, and milkfish.  Its key industries include rice milling, food processing, wood processing, furniture, fuel distribution, shipbuilding, and construction. The manufacturing sector will soon get a boost as an industrial park is currently being developed. Butuan has also proven to be a haven for renewable energy with investments in solar and hydroelectric power generation pouring in the city.

Smart Communications, Globe Telecom, PLDT and Bayantel serve the telecommunications needs of the city.

Culture

Festivities and annual celebrations

Kahimunan Festival The Kahimunan Festival is celebrated every third Sunday of January in celebration of the city patron Sr. Santo Niño. This celebration is a Butuanon version of Sinulog of Cebu City. Kahimunan is a Lumad term which means "gathering".

Balangay/Balanghai Festival Butuan celebrates its annual fiesta, the Balangay Festival, for the celebration of the city patron Saint Joseph every whole month of May, with the exact feast day of St. Joseph on May 19. The city holds many events such as summer league basketball championship games, thanksgiving mass, and more.

Butwaan Festival The newest festival is a feast day celebration of St. Joseph, patron of Butuan, which is held every May 19. This was created last 2013 as replacement to Balangay Festival during the specific date. Both festivals will still celebrates the feast of St. Joseph with Butwaan focus on the Church activities while Balangay will focus on the city government activities.

Cultural Festivals The Cultural festival/tourism consciousness is a week-long celebration that lasts from the last week of July up to August 2 in celebration of the Charter Day of Butuan.
Abayan Festival: The Abayan Festival, a part of the Cultural Festival, is held in celebration of St. Anne, patroness of Agusan River, which is celebrated every last Sunday of July.
Palagsing Festival: "Palagsing" is a local delicacy popularly made in Banza, one of the old poblacion of Butuan. The popularity of making Palagsing in Banza is attributed to the abundance of Lumbiya (Metroxylon sagu Rottb.) where Unaw or lumbiya starch is harvested from the palm tree. Another popular ingredient is young coconut meat. The mixture of unaw, young coconut and brown sugar make palagsing moist and chewy. They are delicately wrapped by banana leaves and are boiled for 30 minutes to create the soft consistency of palagsing. The Palagsing Festival usually held on Adlaw Hong Butuan Celebration every 2nd day of August.
Adlaw Hong Butuan: Adlaw Hong Butuan is the charter day celebration of Butuan, which includes a thanksgiving mass, motorcade, palagsing festival, street party recognitions of outstanding Butuanons and City Government Employees' Night.
Unaw Festival: Unaw Festival is a celebration of the abundance of Lumbia starch or Unaw from the Lumbia tree that has been used as a source of food during World War II and it was usually found in Brgy. Baan km 3 and its neighbouring barangays. The Unaw Festival usually held every 27th day of June joining the fiesta celebration of Mother of Perpetual Help in Baan km 3.
Nilubid Festival and other festivals: The Nilubid Festival is a celebration of the Filipino Rural  Culture and heritage. The term "nilubid" is coined from a local delicacy, twisted hard fried flour, which is famous among people of the city and neighboring towns and provinces. The festival highlights the Filipino Folk Dance competition that is dedicated to the miraculous image of the Virgin Mary, Nuestra Señora Sagrada Corazon de Hesus (Our Lady of the Sacred Heart of Jesus). The Nilubid Festival is held every last week of May in Barangay Golden Ribbon, culminating the end of the annual Flores de Mayo.

Tourism

Natural landmarks
Agusan River: The Agusan River is the widest and most navigable river in Mindanao. Natives who live on the banks of this river pay tribute to their patroness, Senora Santa Ana (Saint Anne) every last Sunday of July in the Abayan festival.
Mount Mayapay: Looming southwest of the Agusan Valley is this majestic mountain plateau. It rises to 2,214 feet (675 m) above sea level. Mount Mayapay got its name from the ancient Madjapahit Empire. The history behind the Srivijaya period bears much meaning and influence of Butuan's pre-historic and archaeological discoveries.

Man-made landmarks
Ramon Magsaysay Bridge: The old Magsaysay Bridge in Butuan, an arched-type steel bridge built during the early sixties spans the mighty Agusan River. For years this bridge serve as a lone vital conduit of the city to the rest of Mindanao island until its new more modern pair came at the city's southern side. The bridge links the main urban center to eastern suburbs of Baan and Ampayon.
Balangay Boats: The Balangays (or Balanghai) are ancient boats that were found in Butuan. They were excavated in the Balangay Shrine, across the Masao River from Bood Promontory. They played a major role in Butuan because Butuan was, and still is, a port city. Since its discovery, the Balangays have become an icon of Butuan. The Kaya ng Pinoy, Inc. recreated the Balangay boats and have sailed it as part of their project, the Balangay Voyage. So far they have only sailed around Southeast Asia. They are planning to sail around the world.
Balangay Shrine Museum: The Balangay Shrine Museum, located in Barangay Libertad, lays the graveyard of the Balangay 1 dated 320 A.D. or 1688 years old. The Balangay shrine museum is located at Balanghai, Libertad, Butuan. This wooden plank-build and edge-pegged boats measured an average of 15 meters in length and 3 meters wide across the beam. To date, 9 Balangays have already been discovered in Ambangan, Libertad. Three have been excavated and others are still in Site.
National Museum (Butuan branch): This museum is the repository of historical and cultural materials and artifacts that proves Butuan's prehistoric existence and rich cultural heritage. There are two exhibit galleries. The Archaeological Hall and Ethnological Hall specimens of stone crafts, metal crafts, woodcrafts, potteries, goldsmith, burial coffins, and other archaeological diggings are exhibited. At the Ethnological Hall are exhibits of contemporary cultural materials the Butuanon or every Filipino for matter used for a living.
Guingona Park: Guingona Park is the native name for that park. Changes of government, however, resulted in a change of name to Rizal Park. It was contended that Rizal went there and that they named the park after him. Recently, the government of Butuan headed by Mayor Amante reconstructed the park and put the name back to Guingona, as it was he who donated the said park some decades past.
Delta Discovery Park: Delta Discovery Park is a newly opened zip-line in Butuan. Delta Discovery Park is at Barangay Bonbon, Butuan. A hidden paradise in the heart of the city, it is also known as the longest zip-line in Mindanao and in Asia with a length of 1.3 kilometers.
Bood Promontory Eco Park: This historic hill is believed to have been the site where Magellan and his men celebrated the first Catholic Mass on Philippine soil and erected a cross when he landed in Mazaua on March 31, 1521. The highest elevation nearest the seaside village of present-day Masao, Bood is a wooded area at a bend in the Masao River (El Rio de Butuan), overlooking Butuan Bay and ancient Butuan as well as the serpentine Masao River. Today, the indigenous Hadlayati tree abound, lording over a clonal nursery and tree park, amidst fishponds and archaeological treasures. According to the chronicles of Spanish historian Pigafetta, the event took place in the afternoon of March 31, 1521, after the Easter Mass was celebrated in the morning of the same date. Two Butuanon brother kings attended these Easter ceremonies. Pigafetta also noted the surrounding fields and balanghai boats on the bay that could be seen from the hill. The eco-park was established to provide the people of Butuan and its visitors a place to rekindle the past amidst a relaxing natural setting.

Government

The local government of Butuan is headed by an elected Mayor and is considered to be the local chief executive of the city. He exercises the general supervision and control over all programs, projects, services, and activities of the city government. He is then accompanied by the law making body of the city which is called, The Sangguniang Panlungsod headed by the elected Vice Mayor as the presiding officer, together with ten elected Sangguniang Panlungsod Members and the President of the Liga ng mga Barangay as an ex-officio member.

City officials

 Elected officials 2022-2025

 Executive
 Mayor: Engr. Ronnie Vicente C. Lagnada
 Vice Mayor: Lawrence Lemuel H. Fortun—Presiding Officer

 Legislative
 16th Sangguniang Panlungsod Members: (As per Election Ranking)
 Joseph Omar O. Andaya
 Cromwell P. Nortega
 Reynante B. Desiata
 John Gil Unay, Sr.
 Cherry May Busa
 Ehrnest John C. Sanchez
 Vincent Rizal C. Rosario
 Victor Vicente G. Plaza
 Eduardo S. Gonzalez
 Arturo P. Gado
 Gemma P. Tabada (ABC Liga ng mga Barangay President)
 Cynth Zephanee N. Nietes (SK Federation President)

Barangay Council

Association of Barangay Captains (Liga ng mga Barangay)
 President: Gemma Plaza Tabada (Barangay Baan Km. 3) 
 Vice President: Juby Ignacio F. Del Gado (Barangay Golden Ribbon)

Sangguniang Kabataan Federation
 President: Dwight Kevin Minglana (Libertad)
 Vice President: Longcanz Cane (Barangay Police Station)
Note: Due to the postponement of Sangguniang Kabataan (SK) Elections in 2013, there was no set of SK Chairperson for each barangay. Hence, there was no election of officers for the Sangguniang Kabataan Federation Butuan Chapter. The positions, thus, was remained vacant until SK Elections was held again.

Barangays and districts 
Butuan is subdivided into 86 barangays and group into 13 districts. Also, barangays 1 thru 26 form the Poblacion (city proper) of Butuan.

Infrastructure

Transportation

Air
The Butuan National Airport, called Bancasi Airport, serves the general area of Butuan, located in the province of Agusan del Norte in the Philippines. It is the only airport in the province and largest in the Caraga region. The airport is classified as a trunkline airport, or a major commercial airport, by the Air Transportation Office, a body of the Department of Transportation and Communications that is responsible for the operations of not only this airport but also of all other airports in the Philippines except the major international airports. It also serves more than 400,000 travelers yearly that includes 250,000 local and foreign tourists. Butuan National Airport can also accommodate 5 to 10 flights a day including large number of aircraft via Cebu Pacific and Philippine Airlines operated by PAL Express.

Sea
As a regional commercial and economic hub, the Port of Masao is Butuan's seaport. It was built to avoid having the city depend on the port of Nasipit, Agusan del Norte. The said port will be having more expansion and development to become a seaport with international standards in the region and in Mindanao.

Land

The main modes of transportation within the city proper are tricycles with 3 distinctive colours. The first and main tricycle is the "orange" tricycle in which it delivers passengers in the majority of butuan. The second is the "red" tricycle where it delivers passengers in the north, northeast and northwest of butuan. The third is the "yellow" tricycle where it delivers passengers in the south, southwest and some parts in the southeast and its also the variant with the least amount of tricycles. Depending on the tricycle, it can accommodate up to 6 or 7 passengers. Another mode of transportation is the small-type jeepneys or multicab vehicles with a seating capacity of at least 15 passengers via fixed routes going to big barangays such as Bancasi, Libertad, Ampayon, Los Angeles and De Oro. Jeepneys, Vans and Buses is also available in Jeepney Terminal, New Integrated Van Terminal and City Integrated Bus Terminal respectively located in Langihan Public Area including the state-of-the-art Transport Terminal at the back of the expansion wing of Robinsons Place Butuan (opened August 2, 2017). They also follow fixed routes to outlying barangays, neighboring towns, municipals, cities and provinces. Long-distance routes also include cities of Manila, Ormoc, Legazpi, Tacloban, Calbayog, Surigao, Tandag, Bislig (Mangagoy), Davao City, Tagum, Cagayan de Oro, Carmen, Balingoan, Gingoog and Malaybalay. The city also has Metered Taxis.

 Mayor Democrito O. Plaza II Avenue Circumferential Road and Diosdado Macapagal Bridge: The circumferential is a  diversion road from Barangay Bancasi to the southern part of the city proper crossing over the PP2.1 Billion Diosdado Macapagal Bridge to the main highway in Baan Km.3 and in Barangay Antongalon.

It was during the Presidency of Joseph Estrada that the project was approved which was lobbied by the city government way back President Fidel Ramos' time to decongest the traffic of the more than 50-year-old Magsaysay Bridge and create an alternate route. However, it was President Gloria Macapagal Arroyo who approved and implemented the project. The bridge was funded through a Special Yen Loan Package from Japan Bank for International Cooperation (JBIC). The project was started on May 6, 2004 and completed in May 2007.

 New Circumferential Road and Four New Bridges (Proposed): The new circumferential road consists of  2-lane road and four new bridges that connects Barangay Sumilihon to Brgy Banza which crosses 2 small rivers (Taguibo and Banza) before crossing to the Third Bridge in Agusan River and connects to Barangay Pagatpatan to Barangay Lumbocan then crosses again in Masao River to reach Barangay Masao and Barangay Pinamanculan before connecting to the National Highway in Barangay Bancasi. The proposed circumferential road will be worth closed to PP2.9 Billion.
 Butuan-Malaybalay Road: The secondary road, known as the Butuan-Malaybalay Road, is scheduled to complete in the future connecting Butuan to Malaybalay via Esperanza, Agusan del Sur.
 Masao-Buenavista-Nasipit Coastal Road: The new coastal road (Masao-Buenavista-Nasipit) is scheduled to complete since it started construction in early 2015 until its completion by late 2023 consisting of concrete road. It connects Brgy. Masao to the municipality of Nasipit, Agusan del Norte.

Sports

With new developments surrounding the old unfinished sports complex facility, the City Government has transferred the sports complex from the 8 hectare complex in Barangay Libertad to the 38 hectare complex in Barangay Tiniwisan/Ampayon. The said complex is worth P250 Million for Phase I will be one of the biggest international standard complex in the Philippines. Phase I consists of a 3,672 seater football main bleacher, a 4,000 seater basketball gymnasium, grass football field, and a rubberized track oval. The Phase I of the Polysports Complex was officially opened in 2015. Phase II will consist of a 2nd main bleacher, an Olympic-size swimming pool, and a baseball/softball field with bleachers, but it was unfinished and under investigated by COA. The said Butuan City Convention Center will be constructed starting on March 24, 2020, and located at the old unfinished sports complex in Libertad, although it remained unfinished for its completion by the next decade.

Education
Being the regional center of Caraga, Butuan is also the region's center of education. There are two universities in the city. The first, Father Saturnino Urios University, a privately run school founded by Rev. Fr. Urios, S.J. in 1901. The second, the Caraga State University— Main Campus, formerly known as the Northern Mindanao State Institute of Science and Technology, is a state-run school founded in 1918. They are among the top two performing universities in the region.

Butuan is known for its education competence. Proof of these are in awards earned. Teachers and school staff of the Butuan Central Elementary School, Butuan City SPED Center and Agusan National High School have large-scale exposure to specialization techniques, as well as seminars and workshops to complement, with partnerships like Philippine-Australia Project on Basic Education (PROBE).

National high schools include the Agusan NHS, Tungao NHS, San Vicente NHS, Libertad NHS and Ampayon ISS (Integrated Secondary School). The city is also home of the Butuan City School of Arts and Trades (BCSAT), a specialization school in the fields of arts and in vocational courses.

As an education hub, Butuan has colleges with a variety of courses. Examples are the Agusan Colleges, Inc., ACLC College of Butuan, Butuan Doctors College, Saint Joseph Institute of Technology, Agusan Business and Arts Foundation, Agusan Institute of Technology, Asian College Foundation, Balite Institute of Technology—Butuan, Butuan City Colleges, Corjesu Computer College, Elisa R. Ochoa Memorial Northern Mindanao School of Midwifery, Father Urios Institute of Technology of Ampayon, Inc., Holy Child Colleges of Butuan City, Philippine Electronics and Communication Institute of Technology, Saint Peter College Seminary, and the Sunrise Christian College Foundation of the Philippines.

Big private universities like the Ateneo, De La Salle Philippines and Iglesia ni Cristo-owned New Era University (NEU) had also expressed to put up local branches.

Other schools include Timber City Academy (Butuan Chinese School), Enfant Cheri Study Centre, Rainbow of Angels Learning Center, Solid Rock Shilo Mission Academy, Ampayon Central Elementary School, Angelicum Montessori School, Butuan Grace Christian School, Butuan Christian Community School, Florencio R. Sibayan Central Elementary School, Libertad Central Elementary School, Obrero Elementary School, and the Ong Yiu Central Elementary School.

Notable personalities

Allan Amoguis:  Italian Catholic bishop, prelate of the Christian Patriarchate of East Asia (born 1973)
Susan Fuentes: The Queen of Visayan Songs (1954–2013). She popularized the songs like Matud Nila, Usahay, Miss Kita Kung Christmas and Rosas Pandan.
Laurice Guillen: Award-winning film director and actress, also the wife of the actor Johnny Delgado (deceased).
Edelmiro A. Amante, Sr.: Former Executive Secretary of Pres. Fidel V. Ramos. Former Representative of Second District and Governor of Agusan del Norte.
Ardy Larong: Small Forward/Shooting Guard of Alaska Aces in the Philippine Basketball Association (PBA).
Marky Cielo: Actor of GMA Network. He died so young at the age of 20 on December 7, 2008, in Antipolo, Rizal. The cause of his death is still unknown.
Stephany Stefanowitz: She represented Butuan in the Miss Philippines Earth 2010. In 2012, she joined Miss Philippines Earth and won the title as Miss Philippines Earth 2012 but she represented Quezon City. She grabbed the title as 1st runner-up in the Miss Earth 2012 pageant held in the country. Her mother is from Barangay Ampayon, Butuan and her father is from Hamburg, Germany.
General Hernando DCA Iriberri: The former Chief of Staff of the Armed Forces of the Philippines from 2015 to 2016. He is not from Butuan but an alumnus of Fr. Saturnino Urios University High School department.
Jason James Dy: The grand champion of the Voice of the Philippines Season 2.
Roy Señeres: Presidential candidate of 2016 National and Local elections. He was the representative of the OFW Club Partylist from 2013 to 2016. He was also the ambassador to the United Arab Emirates during Fidel Ramos administration.
Lance Busa: The grand winner of the first edition of Michael Bolton's singing competition "Bolt of Talent".
Elaine Colima Duran: The grand winner of the third season of Tawag ng Tanghalan.
Police General Debold Menorias Sinas: The 23rd Chief of the Philippine National Police and Undersecretary of the Office of the President of the Philippines.

Sister cities

Local Sisterhood Pact
 Baguio (since May 16, 2011, via SP Res. No. 403-2011)
 Cebu City (since June 27, 2011, via SP Res. No. 493-2011) and Lapu-Lapu (since June 27, 2011, via SP Res. No. 493-A-2011)
 Iligan (since August 8, 2011, via SP Res. No. 538-2011)
 Malaybalay
 Pagadian
 Bayugan
 Makati (since June 13, 2011, via SP Res. No. 419-2011)
 Maragusan (since July 18, 2011, via SP Res. No. 527-2011)
 Dumaguete (since September 2, 2013, via SP Res. No. ___-2013)

Gallery

See also

 Roman Catholic Diocese of Butuan
 List of radio stations in Butuan

References

External links

 [ Philippine Standard Geographic Code]
 Butuan government website

 
1901 establishments in the Philippines
Cities in Agusan del Norte
Former provincial capitals of the Philippines
Highly urbanized cities in the Philippines
Populated places established in 1901
Former sub-provinces of the Philippines